Sungai Buloh Hospital (HSB) is a secondary and tertiary hospital located in Sungai Buloh, Petaling District, Selangor, Malaysia. The hospital covers an area of 130 acres. The hospital serves the districts of Gombak, Petaling and Kuala Selangor with a combined population of more than 2.80 million.

Background
HSB is developed in 1999 and has been initiated to meet the needs of the growing population and also to reduce the influx of patients at Hospital Kuala Lumpur.

The hospital was built by contractor, Tunas Selatan Sdn Bhd and costs RM 1.3 billion.

Awards and Achievements

|-
| 2002
| Ward 54 for "outstanding work in the area of care and treatment of people living with HIV/AIDS in Malaysia".
| UN Malaysia Person / Organisation of the Year Award
| 
|-
| 2020
| The COVID-19 team for its "unwavering efforts to fight the pandemic".
| Global Health Awards
| 
|}

Access
Road
The hospital is easily accessible via North–South Expressway northern route .

Rail and Bus
The hospital is connected to the MRT Putrajaya line  and KTM Komuter  via feeder bus T100 MRT Sungai Buloh - Hospital Sungai Buloh/UiTM Sungai Buloh route.

References

Hospital buildings completed in 1999
Hospitals in Selangor
Teaching hospitals in Malaysia
Hospitals established in 1999
1999 establishments in Malaysia

20th-century architecture in Malaysia